The Augsburg Confession, also known as the Augustan Confession or the Augustana from its Latin name, Confessio Augustana, is the primary confession of faith of the Lutheran Church and one of the most important documents of the Protestant Reformation. The Augsburg Confession was written in both German and Latin and was presented by a number of German rulers and free-cities at the Diet of Augsburg on 25 June 1530.

The Holy Roman Emperor Charles V had called on the Princes and Free Territories in Germany to explain their religious convictions in an attempt to restore religious and political unity in the Holy Roman Empire and rally support against the Ottoman invasion in the 16th century Siege of Vienna. It is the fourth document contained in the Lutheran Book of Concord.

Background

Philipp Melanchthon, Martin Luther and Justus Jonas had already drafted a statement of their theological views in the Articles of Schwabach in 1529, when on 21 January 1530, Emperor Charles V issued letters from Bologna, inviting the Imperial Diet to meet in Augsburg on 8 April for the purpose of discussing and deciding various important questions. Although the writ of invitation was couched in very peaceful language, it was received with suspicion by some of the Protestants. Landgrave Philip of Hesse hesitated to attend the diet, but the Elector John of Saxony, who received the writ 11 March, on 14 March directed Martin Luther, Justus Jonas, Johannes Bugenhagen and Philipp Melanchthon to meet in Torgau, where he was, and present a summary of the Lutheran faith to be laid before the Holy Roman Emperor at the diet.

This summary has received the name of the "Torgau Articles". On 3 April, the elector and reformers started from Torgau, and reached Coburg on 23 April. There, Luther was left behind because he was an outlaw according to the Diet of Worms. The rest reached Augsburg on 2 May. On the journey, Melanchthon worked on an "apology", using the Torgau articles, and sent his draft to Luther at Coburg on 11 May, who approved it. Several alterations were suggested to Melanchthon in his conferences with Jonas, the Saxon chancellor Christian Beyer, the conciliatory Christopher von Stadion, bishop of Augsburg, and the imperial secretary Alfonso de Valdes.

On 23 June, the final form of the text was adopted in the presence of the Elector John of Saxony, the Landgrave Philip of Hesse, the Margrave George of Brandenburg, the Dukes Ernest and Francis of Lüneburg, the representatives of Nuremberg and Reutlingen, and other counselors, besides twelve theologians. After the reading, the confession was signed by the Elector John of Saxony, Margrave George of Brandenburg, Duke Ernest of Lüneburg, the Landgrave Philip of Hesse, the Prince Wolfgang of Anhalt, the representatives of Nuremberg and Reutlingen, and probably also the electoral prince John Frederick and Duke Francis of Lüneburg.

During the diet, the cities of Weißenburg in Bayern, Heilbronn, Kempten, and Windesheim also expressed their concurrence with the confession. The emperor had ordered the confession to be presented to him at the next session, 24 June. When the Protestant princes asked that it be read in public, their petition was refused, and efforts were made to prevent the public reading of the document altogether. The Protestant princes declared that they would not part with the confession until its reading should be allowed.

The 25th was then fixed for the day of its presentation. In order to exclude the people, the little chapel of the episcopal palace was appointed in place of the spacious city hall, where the meetings of the diet were held. The two Saxon chancellors Christian Beyer and Gregor Brück, the former with the plain German copy, the other in traditional Latin language, against the wish of the emperor stepped into the middle of the assembly. The reading of the German version of the text by Christian Beyer lasted two hours and was so distinct that every word could be heard outside. The reading being over, the copies were handed to the emperor. The German copy he gave to the imperial chancellor, the Elector of Mainz. The Latin copy he took away. Neither of the copies is now extant.

The first official publication (Editio princeps) was edited by Philipp Melanchthon, a professor at the University of Wittenberg and a close colleague and friend of Martin Luther.

Contents

The 28 articles
The Augsburg Confession consists of 28 articles presented by Lutheran princes and representatives of "free cities" at the Diet of Augsburg that set forward what the Lutherans believed, taught and confessed in positive (theses) and negative (antitheses) statements.  The theses are 21 Chief Articles of Faith describing the normative principles of Christian faith held by the Lutherans; the antitheses are seven statements describing what they viewed as abuses of the Christian faith present in the Roman Catholic church.

The chief articles of faith (theses)

Abuses corrected

Conclusion
"That in doctrine and ceremonies nothing has been received on our part against Scripture or the Church Catholic." Signatures of several secular leaders in Saxony.

Influence of the Augsburg Confession

The Augsburg Confession became the primary confessional document for the Lutheran movement, even without the contribution of Martin Luther.  Following the public reading of the Augsburg Confession in June 1530, the expected response by Charles V and the Vatican representatives at the Diet of Augsburg was not immediately forthcoming.  Following debate between the court of Charles V and the Vatican representatives, the official response known as the Pontifical Confutation of the Augsburg Confession was produced to the Diet, though the document was so poorly prepared that the document was never published for widespread distribution, nor presented to the Lutherans at the Diet.

In September, Charles V declared the response to be sufficient and gave the Lutheran princes until 15 April 1531 to respond to the demands of the Confutation.  In response, Philip Melanchthon wrote a lengthy and sustained argument both supporting the Augsburg Confession and refuting the arguments made in the Confutation. This document became known as the Apology of the Augsburg Confession and was soon translated into German and was widely distributed and read throughout Germany.

The Lutheran princes at the diet concurrently agreed to a military alliance in the event of action by Charles V known as the Schmalkaldic League.  By 1535, the League admitted any city or state to the alliance that gave official assent to the Augsburg Confession and the Apology.  Significantly, the Confession was translated into English in 1536, and King Henry VIII was given opportunity to sign the confession and join the league, but theological and political disputes would prevent the English church from joining.

The English translation of the Augsburg Confession and German Lutheran theologians would influence the composition of the first of the Anglican articles of faith started in the latter 1530s and culminating with the Thirty-Nine Articles in 1563.  In Scandinavia the Danish-Norwegian king Christian III marched into Copenhagen on 6 August 1536 and six days later he carried out a coup that established the Reformation in Denmark and the start of the Reformation in Norway.

The three bishops who dwelt in Copenhagen were arrested and the rest were tracked down and likewise arrested. The official reason was their hesitation to elect Christian as king and other alleged criminal acts. The real reason was that Christian wanted to kill two birds with one stone: carrying through a Lutheran Reformation and confiscating the bishops' properties, the profits from which was needed to cover the expenses of the recently ended civil war.

In 1540, Philipp Melanchthon produced a revised edition, the Variata, which was signed by John Calvin. Many Lutheran churches specify in their official documents that they subscribe to the "Unaltered Augsburg Confession", as opposed to the Variata.

The political tensions between the Schmalkaldic League and the forces of Charles V and the Vatican eventually led to the Schmalkaldic War in 1546–1547, which ended the 1532 Nuremberg Religious Peace and was won convincingly by Charles V.  The war did not resolve the religious and political situation.  Eight years later, the Lutheran princes and Charles V agreed to the Peace of Augsburg, which granted Lutheranism legal status within the Holy Roman Empire.

Theological disputes within the expanding sphere of Lutheranism to other territories in the latter half of the 16th century led to the compilation of a definitive set of Lutheran Confessions in the Book of Concord in 1580.  The Book of Concord includes the Augsburg Confession and the Apology of the Augsburg Confession as the foundational confessions of the Lutheran faith.

Years of adoption

In music
Felix Mendelssohn's Symphony No. 5 (actually his second symphony in order of composition) was composed to celebrate the 300th anniversary of the Augsburg Confession and thus bears the title The Reformation Symphony. The symphony, however, was not commissioned for the celebrations, because of either the composer's Jewish origins or the inappropriateness of a symphony for the celebrations. Instead, Eduard Grell's work for four men's voices a capella was commissioned.

See also

 Augsburg Confession Variata
 Confessio Catholica
 Confutatio Augustana
 Evangelical Church of the Augsburg Confession in Poland

References

Works cited

Further reading
May, Gerhard. "Augsburg Confession." In The Encyclopedia of Christianity, edited by Erwin Fahlbusch and Geoffrey William Bromiley, 157–159. Vol. 1. Grand Rapids: Wm. B. Eerdmans, 1999. 
Reu, Johann Michael, The Augsburg Confession: A Collection of Sources with an Historical Introduction. St. Louis: Concordia Publishing House, 1983.

External links
 
 The Augsburg Confession (1530) in Latin with a parallel English translation and with notes on the differences in the 1540 edition (Articles I — VII); from Philip Schaff's Creeds of the Evangelical Protestant Churches at the Christian Classics Ethereal Library
 Augsburg Confession (1530), including articles XXII — XXVIII
 Augsburg Confession (1530), complete annotated translation in modern English, with links to source material where available online; translated by Nathaniel J. Biebert (Red Brick Parsonage, 2018-2019).
 Augsburg Confession - Background, brief overview of the historical background of the Augsburg Confession, with paintings of Elector John the Steadfast and Philipp Melanchthon, and a 1575 bird's-eye view of Augsburg
 The Roman Confutation (1530), in an English translation, compares each articles of the confession to Catholic beliefs.
 Audio recording of the first part of the Augsburg Confession in Latin with text
 
 A Chronicle of the Augsburg Confession by Charles Porterfield Krauth, Philadelphia: J. Fredrick Smith, 1878.
 Augsburg Confession in The Lutheran Cyclopedia (1899) edited by Henry Eyster Jacobs
 Augsburg Confession in the Concordia Cyclopedia (page 1)(page 2)
 Augsburg Confession in the Christian Cyclopedia
 An Orthodox Response – Summary of Orthodox Patriarch Jeremias II's letter of 15 May 1576, in which he compares each article of the confession to Orthodox Christian beliefs
 The Roman Catholic Reception of the Augsburg Confession by Robert Kress (JSTOR)

1530 documents
16th-century Christian texts
Christian statements of faith
Book of Concord
Reformation in Germany
History of Augsburg